Lymington is a town in Hampshire, England.

Lymington may also refer to:

Places in or near Lymington, Hampshire
Lymington (UK Parliament constituency), a former electoral district
Lymington Branch Line, a railway
Lymington New Forest Hospital
Lymington Hospital, its predecessor
Lymington and Pennington, a current administrative area
Lymington Pier railway station
Lymington River
Lymington Town F.C.
Lymington Town railway station
RAF Lymington, a World War II airbase

Other places
Lymington, Tasmania, a locality in Australia

People with the surname
John Lymington, 20th century English author